Napier Boys' High School  is a secondary boys' school in, Napier, New Zealand. It currently has a school roll of approximately  pupils. The school provides education from Year 9 to Year 13.

Notable alumni

Business 
Rod Drury – chief executive officer of Xero, accounting software
 Chris Tremain (born 1966) – real estate investor and entrepreneur

Arts 
 John Psathas – internationally-acclaimed music composer

Public service 
 Oscar Alpers (1867–1927), Supreme Court judge
 Frank Corner  (born 1920), diplomat
 Cyril Harker (1899–1970), National MP for Waipawa and Hawke's Bay (1940–1963)
 Sydney Jones (1894–1982), National MP for Hastings (1949–1954)
 Arnold Reedy (1903–1971), Māori leader 
 Percy Storkey (1891–1969), Victoria Cross recipient in an Australian unit
 Chris Tremain (born 1966), MP for Napier (2005–2014)
 Stuart Nash MP for Napier (2014 – present) and Minister of Police (2017–present)

Religion 
 Ralph Vernon Matthews – Bishop of Waiapu from 1979 to 1983
 John Bluck – Dean of ChristChurch Cathedral from 1990 to 2002, Bishop of Waiapu from 2002 to 2008

Sport 
 Aidan Daly – basketball player in the NBL
 Chris Jackson – former New Zealand All Whites soccer captain
 Sam Jenkins – former New Zealand All Whites soccer player and New Zealand Olympian number 1050
 Mark Paston – former All Whites goalkeeper
 Puke Lenden – former basketball player in the NBL
 Jesse Ryder – Black Caps opener and amateur boxer
 Shayne O'Connor – former Black Caps fast bowler
 Jason Stewart – Olympic athlete (800m)
 Hubert McLean – All Black
 Greg Somerville – former All Black No. 991
 Zac Guildford – Crusaders and All Black winger
 Richard Turner – former All Black and rugby commentator
 Daniel Kirkpatrick – Wellington Lions and Hurricanes player
 Bryn Evans – All Black (#1090)
 Gareth Evans – All Black (#1179) and Hurricanes (number 8)
 Brad Weber – All Black (#1140) and Chiefs Halfback
 Tyrone Thompson- Maori All Black and Chiefs Hooker

Other 
Phil Lamason – WWII RNZAF bomber pilot
 Garth McVicar – founder and chairman of the Sensible Sentencing Trust in 2001

Sport 
The school is Super 8 school and has an exchange program with Wairarapa College. It also has a rugby exchange with Palmerston North Boys' High School, the Polson Banner.

Houses 
The school uses a house system; the houses are:
Scinde (blue) the hostel house
Napier (red)  
Hawke  (green) 
Clyde  (yellow)

History 

Napier Boys' High School was founded in 1872 and originally amalgamated with Napier Girls' High School on the 29 January 1884. Established 16 years after Nelson College, Napier Boys' High School remains one of the oldest schools in New Zealand. The school was previously located on Bluff hill. In 1927, Napier Boys' High School relocated to Te Awa for expansion space. In July 1915, William Allan Armour became the new headmaster. Armour revolutionized Napier Boys' High School's academic and sporting aspects. He established the school's credibility and public reputation. In 1928, Armour helped to redevelop the school's campus and to honour his commitment, 'A' block was named after him. After the Napier 1931 earthquake, much of the campus was redeveloped in the Art Deco style. On the 20 November 1998, the Hawkes Bay [Harold] Holt Planetarium was built. On the 19 April 2002, chemistry teacher Reuben John Martin was arrested and charged for manufacturing Class A MDA, Class B MDMA, commonly known as ecstasy, and Class C TMAs. Martin pleaded guilty to drug manufacturing charges on the 11 August 2003 and was released in 2012.

Campus 
The school occupies a site of approximately 30 hectares.

The school's grounds accommodate four rugby and two soccer pitches in winter and eight grass cricket wickets in summer. The school has a swimming complex, a gymnasium, and home to the Hawkes Bay Holt Planetarium.

The boarding house (Scinde House) is located on-site, and accommodates 185 pupils.

Notable teachers
Kirstin Daly-Taylor – Former Olympic athlete in basketball & Head Coach for the Hawke's Bay Hawks
Joe Schmidt – Former coach of the Irish International Rugby Union Team

Notes

References

External links
Schools Website
Statistics
Holt Planetarium

Boarding schools in New Zealand
Boys' schools in New Zealand
Educational institutions established in 1872
Secondary schools in the Hawke's Bay Region
Schools in Napier, New Zealand
1872 establishments in New Zealand